Mangelia michaelseni is a species of sea snail, a marine gastropod mollusk in the family Mangeliidae.

Description
The length of the shell attains 10 mm.

Distribution
This marine species occurs off Uruguay and in the Magellanic Strait

References

  Strebel, Beiträge zur Kenntnis der Molluskenfauna der  Magalhaen-Provinz; Jena,Gustav Fischer,1904–1907

External links
  Tucker, J.K. 2004 Catalog of recent and fossil turrids (Mollusca: Gastropoda). Zootaxa 682:1–1295.
 

michaelseni
Gastropods described in 1905